The Cahill Expressway is an urban freeway in Sydney and was the first freeway constructed in Australia, opening to traffic in 1958. It starts from the Eastern Distributor and Cross City Tunnel in Woolloomooloo, and runs through a series of sunken cuttings and tunnels between the Royal Botanic Garden and The Domain. One of the tunnels is the  Domain Tunnel, located underneath the Royal Botanic Garden. The freeway then runs on an elevated section across the northern edge of the Sydney CBD at Circular Quay, and then across the Sydney Harbour Bridge to North Sydney. It connects there to the Warringah Freeway.

It is named after the then New South Wales Premier John Joseph Cahill, who also approved construction of the Sydney Opera House.

History

The expressway was first proposed in 1945 as part of an overall expressway plan for Sydney. Public opposition began when the proposal was first made public in 1948, with the Quay Planning Protest Committee being formed. Despite the opposition, construction on the elevated section of the expressway went ahead in 1955. Funding was provided by the Sydney Council and the NSW Government, and the elevated section was opened on 24 March 1958. Work on the sunken section commenced almost straight away after that, and the additional section was opened on 1 March 1962.

As part of the Eastern Distributor works in the late 1990s, a landscaped canopy was built over the southern end of Cahill Expressway (where it meets the Eastern Distributor) near the Art Gallery of New South Wales.

In June 2013, the Expressway was temporarily renamed the Tim Cahill Expressway in honour of Socceroo Tim Cahill, ahead of the Socceroos' 2014 FIFA World Cup qualification match against Iraq.

Since 2022, Ventia operates the Domain Tunnel on behalf of Transport for NSW.

Role

The expressway forms a link between Sydney's eastern and northern suburbs, by connecting the Eastern Distributor to the Sydney Harbour Bridge and Sydney Harbour Tunnel. It allows travel directly from the airport to the northern suburbs without traffic signals. The traffic on the elevated section was reduced by half following the opening of the Sydney Harbour tunnel in 1992.

The elevated section is a double deck, with the top deck carrying cars, and the lower deck railway lines and Circular Quay railway station. The station provides easy access to the Sydney Opera House and the Royal Botanical Gardens. The westbound lanes dip underneath the Harbour Bridge approach road, before forming a large spiral circling Fort Street Public School to join to the Bridge in a confined space.

The expressway has a pedestrian walkway next to the traffic lanes, where great views of the Sydney Harbour Bridge and the CBD can be seen. It is accessible by stairs from Macquarie St, or an elevator near Circular Quay railway station. The walkway connects with the Sydney Harbour Bridge walkway. The Roads & Traffic Authority offers tickets to view the New Year's Eve fireworks from the Cahill Expressway deck through a competition.

Former The Sydney Morning Herald writer Elizabeth Farrelly described the freeway as 'doggedly symmetrical, profoundly deadpan, severing the city from the water on a permanent basis'. The sunken section of the expressway runs between the Royal Botanical Gardens and The Domain, key green spaces in Sydney. The Botanic Gardens Trust described the expressway as destroying the spatial relationship between the two.

Demolition of the expressway has been proposed in the past, most prominently by former Australian Prime Minister Paul Keating, who in 1994 offered federal funds in the amount of A$150 million toward such a project. The then NSW Premier, John Fahey, rejected the proposal because of the cost and the resultant traffic problems.

Jeffrey Smart painting

One of Australian artist Jeffrey Smart's most famous works is Cahill Expressway (1962). The painting shows a stylised view of the Cahill Expressway tunnel and approach road, with a single man shown at the side of the image. The painting shows the alienation many feel when faced with the infrastructure of large freeways, especially when closely juxtaposed with pedestrian scale areas.

Exits and interchanges

See also

 Freeways in Australia
 Freeways in Sydney

References

External links
  [CC-By-SA]

Highways in Sydney
Highway 1 (Australia)
Sydney central business district